Mariam Torgomyan (born 16 May 1991) is an Armenian professional footballer. She currently plays for Armenia women's national football team.

See also
List of Armenia women's international footballers

External links
 
Profile at UEFA.com

1991 births
Living people
Armenian women's footballers
Armenia women's international footballers
Place of birth missing (living people)
Women's association football defenders